Qaralar-e Aqataqi (also Romanized as Qarālar-e Āqātaqī; also known as Qarahlar-e Āqā Taqī) is a village in Torkaman Rural District, in the Central District of Urmia County, West Azerbaijan Province, Iran. At the 2006 census, its population was 181, in 54 families.

References 

Populated places in Urmia County